Georgetown is an unincorporated community in Putnam County, Florida, United States, located on the shores of Lake George. The community can be found south of the Welaka State Forest and north of the Lake George Conservation Area.

Geography
Georgetown is located at  (29.391362, -81.638689). Its elevation in 23 feet (7 m).

Notable people 
Red Causey, was a right-handed Major League Baseball pitcher who played for the New York Giants.

References

Unincorporated communities in Putnam County, Florida
Unincorporated communities in Florida
Populated places on the St. Johns River